The subcostal plane is a transverse plane which bisects the body at the level of the 10th costal margin and the vertebra body L3.

References

External links
 http://www.liv.ac.uk/HumanAnatomy/phd/mbchb/travel/surface1.html
 http://www.qub.ac.uk/cskills/Abd%20exam.htm

Anatomical planes